Haroldson Lafayette Hunt Jr. (February 17, 1889 – November 29, 1974) was an American oil tycoon. By trading poker winnings for oil rights according to legend, but more likely through money he gained from successful speculation in oil leases, he ultimately secured title to much of the East Texas Oil Field, one of the world's largest oil deposits.  He acquired rights to East Texas oil lands initially through a $30,000 land purchase from oil speculator Dad Joiner, and founded Hunt Oil in 1936. From it and his other acquisitions, which included diverse interests in publishing, cosmetics, pecan farming, and health food producers, he accrued a fortune that was among the world's largest. In the 1950's, his Facts Forum Foundation supported highly Conservative newspaper columns and radio programs, some of which he authored and produced himself, and for which he became known. At his death, he was reputed to have one of the highest net worths of any individual in the world, a fortune estimated between two and three billion dollars.

Life
Hunt was born near Ramsey, in Carson Township, Fayette County, Illinois, the youngest of eight children. He was named after his father, Haroldson Lafayette Hunt, who was a prosperous farmer-entrepreneur. His mother was Ella Rose (Myers) Hunt.

Hunt was homeschooled. He did not go to elementary school or to high school. Later, he said that education is an obstacle to making money. As a teenager, Hunt traveled to different places before he settled in Arkansas, where he was running a cotton plantation by 1912. He had a reputation as a math prodigy and was a gambler. It was said that after his cotton plantation was flooded, he turned his last $100 into more than $100,000 after he had gambled in New Orleans. With his winnings, he purchased oil properties in the neighborhood of El Dorado, Arkansas. He was generous to his employees, who, in turn, were loyal to him by informing him of rumors of a massive oil field to the south, in East Texas. In negotiations over cheese and crackers, at the Adolphus Hotel in Dallas, with the wild-catter who discovered the East Texas Oil Field, Columbus Marion "Dad" Joiner, Hunt secured title to what was the largest known oil deposit in the world. Hunt had agreed to pay Joiner $1,000,000 and to protect him from liability for his many fraudulent transactions surrounding the property. In 1957, Fortune estimated that Hunt had a fortune of $400–700 million, and was one of the eight richest people in the United States. J. Paul Getty, who was considered to be the richest private citizen in the world, said of Hunt, "In terms of extraordinary, independent wealth, there is only one man—H. L. Hunt."

Personal life

Hunt had fifteen children by three wives.

He married Lyda Bunker of Lake Village, Arkansas, in November 1914 and remained married to her until her death in 1955. His seven children by her were: Margaret (1915–2007), Haroldson ("Hassie", 1917–2005), Caroline (1923–2018), Lyda (born and died in 1925), Nelson Bunker (1926–2014), William Herbert (1929), and Lamar (1932–2006). Their home on White Rock Lake in Dallas was styled after Mount Vernon though much larger.

His first son, Hassie, who was expected to succeed him in control of the family business, was lobotomized in response to increasingly erratic behavior. He outlived his father. Lamar founded the American Football League and created the Super Bowl, drawing on the assistance of his children in selecting the game's name. Two other children, Herbert and Bunker, are famous for their purchasing much of the world's silver, in an attempt to corner the market. They ultimately owned more silver than any government in the world before their scheme was discovered and undone. Bunker Hunt was briefly one of the wealthiest men in the world, having discovered and taken title to the Libyan oil fields, before Muammar Gaddafi nationalized the properties.

While still married to Lyda, H. L. Hunt is said to have married Frania Tye of Tampa, Florida, 
in November 1925 by using the name Franklin Hunt. Frania claimed to have discovered the bigamous nature of her marriage in 1934, and in a legal settlement in 1941, Hunt created trust funds for each of their four children, and she signed a document stipulating that no legal marriage between them had ever existed. About the same time, she briefly married then divorced Hunt's employee, John Lee, taking the last name Lee for herself and her four children. Her four children by Hunt were: Howard (born 1926), Haroldina (1928), Helen (1930), and Hugh ("Hue", 1934). Frania Tye Lee died in 2002.

Hunt supported and had children by Ruth Ray of Shreveport, Louisiana, whom he had met when she was a secretary in his Shreveport office. They married in 1957 after the death of Hunt's wife Lyda. His four children by her were: Ray Lee (born 1943), June (1944), Helen (1949), and Swanee (1950). His youngest son, Ray Lee, ultimately inherited the business and was a major supporter of President George W. Bush.

His 15 children in birth order are:
 Margaret Hunt Hill (October 19, 1915 – June 14, 2007): philanthropist and co-owner of Hunt Petroleum.
 H. L. "Hassie" Hunt III (November 23, 1917 – April 20, 2005): diagnosed with schizophrenia in the early 1940s; co-owner of Hunt Petroleum.
 Caroline Rose Hunt (January 8, 1923 – November 13, 2018): Founder and Honorary Chairman of Rosewood Hotels & Resorts which operates The Mansion on Turtle Creek.
 Lyda Bunker Hunt (February 19, 1925 – March 20, 1925) (Died as an infant). 
 Nelson Bunker Hunt (February 22, 1926 – October 21, 2014): A major force in developing Libyan oil fields. Eventually attempted to corner the world market in silver in 1979, and was convicted of conspiring to manipulate the market. Legendary owner-breeder  of Thoroughbred racehorses.
 Howard Lee Hunt (October 25, 1926 – October 13, 1975)
 Haroldina Franch Hunt (October 26, 1928 – November 10, 1995)
 William Herbert Hunt (born March 6, 1929) A major and defining force in the oil industry, he was also a legendary businessman and oilman. At times, ran Hunt Oil, Hunt Petroleum, Hunt Energy, Placid Oil, etc. The founder of Petro-Hunt LLC.
 Helen Lee Cartledge Hunt (October 28, 1930 – June 3, 1962) died in the Air France Flight 007 disaster, the worst single aircraft disaster up until that time.
 Lamar Hunt (August 2, 1932 – December 13, 2006): co-founder of the American Football League and the North American Soccer League; owner of the Kansas City Chiefs of the National Football League; owner of the Columbus Crew and FC Dallas of Major League Soccer; backer of World Championship Tennis; impetus behind 1966 AFL-NFL merger, coined the name "Super Bowl".
 Hugh S. Hunt (October 14, 1934 – November 12, 2002): lived in Potomac, Maryland, founder of Constructivist Foundation.
 Ray Lee Hunt (born c. 1943): chairman of Hunt Oil.
 June Hunt (born c. 1944): host of a daily religious radio show, Hope for the Heart.
 Helen LaKelly Hunt (born c. 1949): a pastoral counselor in Dallas; co-manager of the Hunt Alternatives Fund, one of the family's charitable arms.
 Swanee Hunt (born May 1, 1950): former U.S. ambassador to Austria; now head of the Women and Public Policy Program at the John F. Kennedy School of Government in Cambridge, Massachusetts, and president of Hunt Alternatives Fund.

A scandal emerged in 1975, after his death, when it was discovered that he had a hidden bigamous relationship, with his second wife living in New York.
  
After marriage to Ruth Ray, Hunt became a Baptist and was a member of the First Baptist Church of Dallas. He was a major financial contributor toward the establishment of the conservative Christian evangelical Criswell College in Dallas.

After several months at Baylor Hospital in Dallas, Hunt died at age 85, and was buried in Sparkman-Hillcrest Memorial Park Cemetery.

The founder of the "transcendental black metal" band Liturgy, Hunter Hunt-Hendrix, is his grandchild.

Connection to white supremacy
Multiple sources, including American civil rights icon Malcolm X, implicate Hunt, a Democrat, as a lifelong racist who provided major financial assistance to several far-right organizations, such as the Minutemen and the John Birch Society. Hunt considered African Americans a political threat and made this clear in his radio interviews and broadcasts.  One of Hunt's chief allies, Allen Zoll, said that since 1936 Hunt advocated deporting all African Americans to Africa. For this reason, Hunt supplied Nation of Islam leader Elijah Muhammad continuous financial support due to the latter's belief in racial separation from whites.

In 1965, Hunt encouraged the Democrat Alabama Gov. George C. Wallace, a white supremacist, to use the scheme of running his wife, Lurleen Wallace, for election as governor in a bald effort to evade the state's constitutional rule that a governor could not succeed himself.

JFK conspiracy allegations
Madeleine Duncan Brown, an advertising executive who claimed to have had both an extended love affair and a son with President Lyndon B. Johnson, said that she was present at a party at the Dallas home of Clint Murchison Sr. (another oil tycoon), on the evening prior to the assassination of John F. Kennedy that was attended by Johnson as well as other famous, wealthy, and powerful individuals including Hunt, Murchison, J. Edgar Hoover, and Richard Nixon.

According to Brown, Johnson had a meeting with several of the men after which he told her: "After tomorrow, those goddamn Kennedys will never embarrass me again. That's no threat. That's a promise." Brown's story received national attention and became part of at least a dozen John F. Kennedy assassination conspiracy theories.

This conspiracy theory was debunked by Kennedy assassination investigator Dave Perry. Evidence showed neither President Johnson nor Hoover were in Dallas at the time of the alleged party and Murchison had not lived in his Dallas home for a number of years. Witnesses place Murchison at his East Texas ranch.

Publications
Books
 Fabians Fight Freedom. Dallas: H. L. Hunt Press.
 Alpaca. Dallas: H. L. Hunt Press (1960)
 Alpaca Revisited. Dallas: HLH Products (1967)
 H. L. Hunt: Early Days. Dallas: Parade (1973)
 Hunt Heritage: The Republic and Our Families. Dallas: Parade (1973)
 Right of Average. Dallas: HLH Products (1960s)

Articles
 "From H. L. Hunt." American [Odessa, Texas] (February 2, 1967).
 "Reducing Hospital Costs." Life Lines, vol. 16, no. 4 (January 9, 1974), p. 4. .

See also

 Walter L. Buenger, historian at Texas A&M University, in 1994 wrote the Hunt biography in Dictionary of American Biography.
 Hunt Oil Company
 List of wealthiest historical figures
 List of richest Americans in history

Explanatory notes

Citations

General sources 
 Brown, Stanley H. (1976) H. L. Hunt. Chicago: Playboy Press. . .
 Burrough, Bryan. (2010) The Big Rich: The Rise and Fall of the Greatest Texas Oil Fortunes. New York: Penguin Press. . .

Further reading
 Buckley, Tom. "Just Plain H. L. Hunt." Esquire (January 1967), pp. 64+. Portrait photograph by Diane Arbus.
 "The richest American would like to be no different from you and me. He wears shiny blue suits, cuts his own hair and carries his lunch in a brown paper bag."
 Curington, John, and Michael Whitington. H. L. Hunt: Motive & Opportunity. Foreword by  Cyril Wecht, M.D., J.D. 23 House (2018). .
 Curtis, Adam. "YOU THINK YOU ARE A CONSUMER BUT MAYBE YOU HAVE BEEN CONSUMED". BBC (March 5, 2013).
 Hendershot, Heather. What's Fair on the Air? Cold War Right-Wing Broadcasting and the Public Interest. University of Chicago Press (2011).
 Honorable Mention for the Prose Book Award, Association of American Publishers. Covers the rise and fall of prominent right wing radio hosts: H. L. Hunt, Dan Smoot, Carl McIntire, and Billy James Hargis.
 Hurt, Harry (III). Texas Rich: The Hunt Dynasty, From the Early Oil Days Through the Silver Crash. New York: W.W. Norton (1981). . .
 Glaser, Vera. "Millionaire H. L. Hunt Talks Politics." News [Chicago, Ill.] (August 27, 1964).
 "Interview with H. L. Hunt". Playboy (August 1966), pp. 47+.
 This article can be collected in the video game Mafia 3 on the PlayStation 4 and read in its entirety.
 Tuccille, Jerome. Kingdom: The Story of the Hunt Family of Texas. Beard Books (2004).
 Vertical Files. Dolph Briscoe Center for American History, University of Texas at Austin.

External links
 Hunt Oil
 
 Files on Hunt at the Harold Weisberg Archive
 Mirrored at Internet Archive
 H.L. Hunt's Boys and the Circle K Cowboys
 Hunt Heirs fight over Estate
 Biography of H. L. Hunt by Jerrell Dean Palmer in the Handbook of Texas Online
 A Matter of Trust by Gretel C. Kovach . D Magazine (c. February 2008).
 Hunt's FBI files at Internet Archive
 Part 1.
 Part 2.

1889 births
1974 deaths
20th-century American businesspeople
American billionaires
American businesspeople in the oil industry
Burials at Sparkman-Hillcrest Memorial Park Cemetery
Businesspeople from Arkansas
Businesspeople from Texas
Hunt family
John Birch Society members
People from Ramsey, Illinois
Southern Baptists
Texas Oil Boom people
Texas Republicans
American white supremacists